Sawsan al-Sha'er (born July 12, 1956) is widely regarded as Bahrain's most influential liberal intellectual. A journalist and author, she is a columnist with Al-Watan newspaper, having joined the staff there from the pro-government Al-Ayam.

Ms. al-Sha'er is well known for her liberal opinions and has been an outspoken critic of religious "extremism". Unlike many Arab liberals, Ms. al-Sha'er has not been afraid to debate with religious clerics and criticize their opinions. This has brought her into confrontation with many of Bahrain's Islamist politicians, such as Ali Salman and Adel Mouwda. She has accused "extremists" backing suicide bombers in Iraq of trying to ‘lead Bahrain to hell’.

While a leading supporter of King Hamad's political liberalization, Ms. al-Sha'er has criticised the government whenever it has failed to meet its reform commitments and over the performance of individual ministers. On 26 February 2006, in Al-Watan, she was scathing about the Minister of Housing, Fahmi al-Jowder, over his "ludicrous praise reminiscent of the Saddam Hussain coterie" .

Education
She holds a Bachelor of Arts in Literature from Beirut Arab University’s Department of History.

Career
From 1989 to 2005, she worked for Al-Ayam, but since 2005 she has worked for Al-Watan. Her column there is كلمة أخيرة (“One Last Word”). She has also worked for several other Gulf, including Al-Watan (Kuwait), Al Yaum in Saudi Arabia, and Al-Watan (Qatar).

In 2005, she began hosting a TV show based on the column, likewise entitled “One Last Word.”

She volunteers for several local organizations, including the Bahraini Society for Child Development, the Mercy Center for the Care of People with Severe Mental Retardation, the Consumer Protection Association, the Bahrain Journalists’ Association, and the Bahrain Society Forum.

The Bahraini government ordered a Bahraini Al-Watan article she wrote to be withdrawn over allegations she made that the Iranian Shia lobby controlled the state of Kuwait.

In 2015, a dispute with the Minister of Information of Bahrain led “One Last Word” to be suspended, but this was overridden by King Hamad bin Isa Al Khalifa ordering immediate resumption of its broadcast.

Awards
 Bahrain National Merit Award, 1993
 Creative Pioneer Award from Al-Muharraq SC, 1996
 Best Social Television Program Award, 1996
 Best Talk Show Award from the 2007 Cairo International Film Festival
 National Service Award, First Class, 2009
 Best Journalist Award at Creativity Awards of the Arab Media Forum, 2009

Publications
 البحرين قصة الصراع السياسي 1904 – 1956 (“Bahrain: History of Political Conflict 1904—1956”), co-written with Muhammad Abdulqadir al-Jassim (2000)
 كلمة اخيرة (“One Last Word”), collected articles (2007)

External links
 MEMRI translates into English a debate in the Bahraini press on suicide bombers between Sawsan Al Sha’er and Akhbar Al Khaleej columnist Hafez Al-Sheikh Saleh (8 July 2005).
 The Proponents of the Suicide Ideology Have Taken Advantage of Global Communications (Eng trans by MEMRI), Free Muslims, (15 May 2005)

References

Living people
Bahraini journalists
Bahraini women journalists
1956 births
Beirut Arab University alumni